Maryna Verbova (born 5 August 1998) is a Ukrainian Paralympic swimmer competing in S4-classification events. She represented Ukraine at the 2016 Summer Paralympics and she won the bronze medal in the women's 50 metre backstroke S4 event. She also competed at the 2020 Summer Paralympics in Tokyo, Japan.

She won the silver medal in the women's 50 metre backstroke S4 event at the 2014 IPC Swimming European Championships held in Eindhoven, the Netherlands.

At the 2018 World Para Swimming European Championships she won the gold medal in the women's 150 metres individual medley S4 and the silver medal in the women's 50 metres backstroke S4 event.

References 

Living people
1998 births
Place of birth missing (living people)
Medalists at the 2016 Summer Paralympics
Swimmers at the 2016 Summer Paralympics
Swimmers at the 2020 Summer Paralympics
Paralympic bronze medalists for Ukraine
Paralympic medalists in swimming
S4-classified Paralympic swimmers
Swimmers with cerebral palsy
Paralympic swimmers of Ukraine
Ukrainian female backstroke swimmers